Paraguaçu Paulista is a municipality in south-west of the state of São Paulo in Brazil. It is part of the Microregion of Assis, situated in the middle Paranapanema Valley. The population is 45,945 (2020 est.) in an area of 1001.3 km². It's the second largest population of microregion and the 3rd of mesoregion, and is 422 km away from the capital, São Paulo. Paraguaçu was created as a district of the (then) municipality of Conceição de Monte Alegre in 1923. It became a separate municipality in 1925. Its name was changed to Paraguaçu Paulista in 1948.

References

Municipalities in São Paulo (state)
1923 establishments in Brazil